James Samuel Vincent (born May 18, 1963) is an American former professional basketball player and coach.

Vincent won the State of Michigan "Mr. Basketball" award in 1981, the first year the award was given. He attended Lansing's Eastern High School, where he scored 61 points in one game as a senior, breaking the previous city scoring record of 54 set by Magic Johnson at Everett High School.

A 6'2" point guard, Vincent followed in the footsteps of his older brother Jay Vincent, attending Michigan State University and earning Sporting News All-America honors in 1985. After graduating from college, he was selected by the Boston Celtics with the twentieth pick of the 1985 NBA draft. He played two seasons for the Celtics, winning an NBA Championship ring as a reserve in 1986, before joining the Seattle SuperSonics, who promptly traded him to the Chicago Bulls for Sedale Threatt. After one-and-a-half solid seasons with the Bulls, he was selected by the Orlando Magic in the 1989 NBA expansion draft, and he finished his NBA career with the Magic in 1992. He scored 3,106 points and tallied 1,543 assists during his seven-year tenure in the league.

Shortly after retiring, Vincent worked at Disney's Wide World of Sports in Walt Disney World. During the late 1990s, he coached basketball in South Africa, and he has also coached in Greece, Netherlands, Nigeria, and the NBDL. At the 2004 Summer Olympics, he led the Nigerian women's basketball team to a 68–64 victory over South Korea, which was the first ever victory by an African nation in an Olympic women's basketball contest.

Coaching career
He was coach of the Fort Worth Flyers in the 2005–06 season. Shortly after coaching the Nigeria men's team to the second round of the 2006 FIBA World Championship (including a shocking upset of traditional power Serbia and Montenegro), he was hired as an assistant coach by the Dallas Mavericks.

On May 25, 2007 Vincent was introduced as the new head coach of the Charlotte Bobcats of the NBA. On April 26, 2008 Vincent was relieved of his head coaching duties.  Later that year, Vincent was named the head coach of the Anaheim Arsenal of the NBA Development League.

Nigerian national basketball team

Vincent assumed coaching the D'Tigress at the 2004 Summer Olympics. He led the team to a 68–64 victory over South Korea, the victory was the first victory by an African side in the women's basketball event in the Olympics. In 2005, Sam Vincent led the Nigerian women's basketball team to their second tournament victory in the FIBA African Basketball Championship (Afrobasket).

Vincent returned as the team's head coach in 2017. He led the team to a 100 per cent performance in the 2017 FIBA African women's basketball tournament Afrobasket in Bamako, Mali. The team clinched their third Afrobasket title by defeating Senegal by 65–48 points in the final and consequently qualifying for the FIBA women's basketball World cup in Spain.

Vincent had his appointment as head coach of the Nigeria Women's Basketball Team terminated by the Nigeria Basketball Federation on Thursday, August 2 while the team was preparing for the 2018 FIBA Women's Basketball World Cup.

Vincent was appointed as head coach of the Bahrain National team replacing Serbian coach Darko Russo. This was after having coached the Riffa, Manama and Al-Ahli Manama clubs.

Head coaching record

|-
| align="left" |Charlotte
| align="left" |
|82||32||50||.390|| align="center" |4th in Southeast||—||—||—||—
| align="center" |Missed Playoffs
|-class="sortbottom"
| align="left" |Career
| ||82||32||50||.390|| ||—||—||—||—

References

External links
 NBA.com coach profile

1963 births
Living people
20th-century African-American sportspeople
21st-century African-American sportspeople
African-American basketball coaches
African-American basketball players
All-American college men's basketball players
American expatriate basketball people in Greece
American expatriate basketball people in the Netherlands
American expatriate basketball people in South Africa
American expatriate sportspeople in Nigeria
American men's basketball players
American women's basketball coaches
Anaheim Arsenal coaches
Aris B.C. players
Basketball coaches from Michigan
Basketball players from Michigan
Boston Celtics draft picks
Boston Celtics players
Charlotte Bobcats head coaches
Chicago Bulls players
Dallas Mavericks assistant coaches
Fort Worth Flyers coaches
Gymnastikos S. Larissas B.C. coaches
McDonald's High School All-Americans
Michigan State Spartans men's basketball players
Mobile Revelers coaches
Orlando Magic expansion draft picks
Orlando Magic players
Parade High School All-Americans (boys' basketball)
Point guards
Seattle SuperSonics players
Sportspeople from Lansing, Michigan